Anna Wörner (also spelled Woerner; born 27 September 1989) is a German freestyle skier, specializing in ski cross.

Wörner competed at the 2010 Winter Olympics for Germany. She placed 7th in the qualifying round in ski cross, to advance to the knockout stages. She failed to finish her first round heat, and did not advance.

As of April 2013, her best finish at the World Championships is 5th, in 2013.

Wörner made her World Cup debut in February 2008. As of March 2013, she has three World Cup victories, with the first coming at Blue Mountain in 2010/11. Her best World Cup overall finish in ski cross is 7th, in 2010/11.

World Cup podiums

References

External links 
  (freestyle)
  (alpine)
 
 

1989 births
Living people
Olympic freestyle skiers of Germany
Freestyle skiers at the 2010 Winter Olympics
Freestyle skiers at the 2014 Winter Olympics
Sportspeople from Garmisch-Partenkirchen
German female freestyle skiers
21st-century German women